Eupithecia planiscripta is a moth in the family Geometridae first described by William Warren in 1902. It is found in Australia.

References

Moths described in 1902
planiscripta
Moths of Australia